Victoria-Tobique was a provincial electoral district for the Legislative Assembly of New Brunswick, Canada.  This riding was created in the 1973 redistribution when New Brunswick moved to single member districts. It had previously been part of the Victoria district which returned two members.

The riding, which was not changed in the 1994 redistribution, is made up of the anglophone parts of Victoria County which are primarily along the Tobique River.  It includes three incorporated municipalities: Perth-Andover, Plaster Rock and Aroostook as well as the Tobique First Nation Indian reserve.

In 2006, it added small parts of Carleton County to its territory. It was abolished in the 2013 redistribution.

Members of the Legislative Assembly

Election results

References

External links 
Website of the Legislative Assembly of New Brunswick

Former provincial electoral districts of New Brunswick